Past Lives is a compilation of live performances of post-hardcore band Saccharine Trust, released in 1989 through SST.

Track listing

References

External links 
 

1989 live albums
SST Records live albums
Saccharine Trust albums